Mass media and American politics covers the role of newspapers, magazines, radio, television, and social media from the colonial era to the present.

Colonial and Revolutionary eras

The first newspapers appeared in major port cities such as Philadelphia, New York, Boston, and Charleston in order to provide merchants with the latest trade news. They typically copied any news that was received from other newspapers, or from the London press. The editors discovered they could criticize the local governor and gain a bigger audience; the governor discovered he could shut down the newspapers. The most dramatic confrontation came in New York in 1734, where the governor brought John Peter Zenger to trial for criminal libel after his paper published some  satirical attacks. Zenger's lawyers argued that truth was a defense against libel and the jury acquitted Zenger, who became the iconic American hero for freedom of the press.  The result was an emerging tension between the media and the government. Literacy was widespread in America, with over half of the white men able to read. The illiterates often could hear newspapers read aloud at local taverns. By the mid-1760s, there were 24 weekly newspapers in the 13 colonies (only New Jersey was lacking one), and the satirical attack on government became common practice in American newspapers. The French and Indian war (1757–63) was the featured topic of many newspaper stories, giving the colonials a broader view of American affairs. Benjamin Franklin, already famous as a printer in Philadelphia published one of the first editorial cartoons, Join, or Die, calling on the colonies to join together to defeat the French. By reprinting news originating in other papers, colonial printers created a private network for evaluating and disseminating news for the whole colonial world. Franklin took the lead, and eventually had two dozen newspapers in his network. The network played a major role in organizing opposition to the Stamp Act, and in organizing and embolding the Patriots in the 1770s.

Colonial newspaper networks played a major role in fomenting the American Revolution, starting with their attack on the Stamp Act of 1765. They provided essential news of what was happening locally and in other colonies, and they provided the arguments used by the patriots, to Voice their grievances such as "No taxation without representation!"  The newspapers also printed and sold pamphlets, such as the phenomenally successful Common Sense (1776), which destroyed the king's prestige and jelled Patriot opinion overnight in favor of independence.  Neutrality became impossible, and the few Loyalist newspapers were hounded and ceased publication when the war began. However, the British controlled important cities for varying periods of time, including New York City, 1776 to 1783. They sponsored a Loyalist press that vanished in 1783.

New nation, 1780s–1820s

With the formation of the first two political parties in the  1790s, Both parties set up national networks of newspapers to provide a flow of partisan news and information for their supporters.  The newspapers also printed pamphlets, flyers, and ballots that voters could simply drop in the ballot box.

By 1796, both parties had a national network of newspapers, which attacked each other vehemently.  The Federalist and Republican newspapers of the 1790s traded vicious barbs against their enemies.

The most heated rhetoric came in debates over the French Revolution, especially the Jacobin Terror of 1793–94 when the guillotine was used daily.  Nationalism was a high priority, and the editors fostered an intellectual nationalism typified by the Federalist effort to stimulate a national literary culture through their clubs and publications in New York and Philadelphia, and through Federalist Noah Webster's efforts to simplify and Americanize the language.

At the height of political passion came in 1798 as the Federalists in Congress passed the four Alien and Sedition Acts. The fourth Act made it a federal crime to publish "any false, scandalous, or malicious writing or writings against the Government of the United States, with intent to defame... Or to bring them... into contempt or disrepute." Two dozen men were charged with felonies for violating the  Sedition Act, chiefly newspaper editors from the Jeffersonian Republican Party. The act expired in 1801.

Second Party System: 1830s–1850s

Both parties relied heavily on their national network of newspapers. Some editors were the key political players in their states, and most of them filled their papers with useful information on rallies and speeches and candidates, as well as the text of major speeches and campaign platforms.

Third Party System: 1850s–1890s

Newspapers continued their role as the main internal communication system for the Army-style campaigns of the era. The goal was not to convince independents, who are few in number, but to rally all the loyal party members to the polls by making them enthusiastic about the party's platform, and apprehensive about the enemy.

Nearly all weekly and daily papers were party organs until the early 20th century. Thanks to Hoe's invention of high-speed rotary presses for city papers, and free postage for rural sheets, newspapers proliferated. In 1850, the Census counted 1,630 party newspapers (with a circulation of about one per voter), and only 83 "independent" papers. The party line was behind every line of news copy, not to mention the authoritative editorials, which exposed the 'stupidity' of the enemy and the 'triumphs' of the party in every issue. Editors were senior party leaders, and often were rewarded with lucrative postmasterships. Top publishers, such as Horace Greeley, Whitelaw Reid, Schuyler Colfax, Warren Harding and James Cox were nominated on the national ticket. After 1900, William Randolph Hearst, Joseph Pulitzer and other big city politician-publishers discovered they could make far more profit through advertising, at so many dollars per thousand readers. By becoming non-partisan they expanded their base to include the opposition party and the fast-growing number of consumers who read the ads but were less and less interested in politics. There was less and less political news after 1900, apparently because citizens became more apathetic, and shared their partisan loyalties with the new professional sports teams that attracted larger and larger audiences.

Progressive era

The American Newspaper industry during this era had been massively expanding. The number of English-language newspapers had nearly tripled during this time. Technology had a hand to do with this because of faster printing presses, and more efficient transportation. Newspapers such as the New York World and the New York Journal appealed to a wide variety of audiences with pages devoted to finances, sports, women, entertainment, etc. Special Interest newspapers were also on the rise during this period with many different groups pushing their agenda through newspapers and other forms of media. These special interest newspapers include the National American Woman Suffrage Association's Woman's Journal, The Anti-Saloon League's American Issue, and others. There even came a time that there was up to nine publications in the major cities such as Chicago, Boston, and New York which in turn created fierce competition. Competition caused these publications to lower their prices to just a penny just to stay afloat.

Magazines were not a new medium but they became much more popular around 1900, some with circulations in the hundreds of thousands of subscribers.  Thanks to the rapid expansion of national advertising, the cover price fell sharply to about 10 cents. One cause was the heavy coverage of corruption in politics, local government and big business, especially by Muckrakers.  They were journalists in the Progressive Era (1890s-1920s) who wrote for popular magazines to expose social and political sins and shortcomings. They relied on their own  investigative journalism reporting; muckrakers often worked to expose social ills and corporate and political corruption. Muckraking magazines–notably McClure's–took on corporate monopolies and crooked political machines while raising public awareness of chronic urban poverty, unsafe working conditions, and social issues like child labor.  These Journalists were nicknamed muckrakers by Theodore Roosevelt because he complained they were being disruptive by raking up the muck.

Ray Stannard Baker, George Creel, and Brand Whitlock specialized in exposing corruption at the state and local levels. Lincoln Steffens went after corruption in big cities. Ida Tarbell attacked John D. Rockefeller's Standard Oil Company. Most of the muckrakers wrote nonfiction, but fictional exposes often had a major impact as well, such as those by Upton Sinclair.  He is best known for exposing the corrupt meatpacking industry and the horrific working conditions of men working in these factories and the contamination in the meat.

New Deal era 

Most of the major newspapers in the larger cities were owned by conservative publishers and they turned hostile to liberal President Franklin D Roosevelt by 1934 or so, including major chains run by William Randolph Hearst. Roosevelt turned to radio, where he could reach more listeners more directly. During previous election campaigns, the parties sponsored nationwide broadcasts of major speeches. Roosevelt, however, gave intimate talks, person-to-person, as if he were in the same room sitting next to the fireplace. His rhetorical technique was extraordinarily effective. However, it proved very hard to duplicate. Young Ronald Reagan, beginning a career in as a radio broadcaster and Hollywood star, was one of the few to match the right tone, nuance, and intimacy that Roosevelt had introduced.

In peacetime, Freedom of the press was not an issue for newspapers. However radio presented the new issue, for the government control the airwaves and licensed them. The Federal Communications Commission ruled in the "Mayflower decision" in 1941 against the broadcasting of any editorial opinion, although political parties could still purchase airtime for their own speeches and programs. This policy was replaced in 1949 by the "Fairness Doctrine" which allowed editorials, if opposing views were given equal time.

Television era: 1950–1980s 
Television arrived in the American home in the 1950s, and immediately became the main campaign medium. Party loyalties had weakened and there was a rapid growth in the number of independents. As a result, candidates Paid less attention to rallying diehard supporters and instead appealed to independent-minded voters. They adopted television advertising techniques as their primary campaign device. At first the parties paid for long-winded half-hour or hour long speeches. By the 1960s, they discovered that the 30-second or one-minute commercial, repeated over and over again, was the most effective technique. It was expensive, however, so fund-raising became more and more important in winning campaigns.

New media era: since 1990 

Major technological innovations transformed the mass media. Radio, already overwhelmed by television, transformed itself into a niche service. It developed an important political dimension based on Talk radio. Television survived with a much reduced audience, but remained the number one advertising medium for election campaigns. Newspapers were in desperate trouble; most afternoon papers closed, and most morning papers barely survived, as the Internet undermined both their advertising and their news reporting.

The new social media, such as Facebook and Twitter, made use first of the personal computer and the Internet, and after 2010 of the smart phones to connect hundreds of millions of people, especially those under age 35. By 2008, politicians and interest groups were experimenting with systematic use of social media to spread their message among much larger audiences than they had previously reached.

As political strategists turn their attention to the 2016 presidential contest, they identify Facebook as an increasingly important advertising tool. Recent technical innovations have made possible more advanced divisions and subdivisions of the electorate. Most important, Facebook can now deliver video ads to small, highly targeted subsets. Television, by contrast, shows the same commercials to all viewers, and so cannot be precisely tailored. Online presence is vital to the success of a presidential candidate's campaign. Social media presence lets candidates: have direct access to voters, advertise for free, and fundraise, among other benefits.

It is also important to look at women in American politics and how they are portrayed in the media, as they are largely under represented in the news. "For example, Rakow and Kranich (1991), in their study of three network news programs, found that women were used as on camera sources only 15% of the time". This highlights how women are extremely under represented not only in American Politics but also within the media.

Contemporary media

As a few new technologies were becoming easily available, experts did not expect the internet to have a major impact in American politics, before the year 2000. During this time mass media outlets such as newspapers, radios, and networks were losing public in alarming numbers. The focus in the newsroom for mass media outlets shifted from policy to character, when addressing American political news. This change only aggravated the opinion of the American public, on the way mass media handled political news. During this time political candidates would use paid political advertising, rich in content, in order to better inform about their policies to the public.

While the introduction of the internet and digital media gave some hope of changing the way mass media portrayed political news, this did not happen. Immediacy, “the quality of bringing one into direct and instant involvement with something, giving rise to a sense of urgency or excitement,” continued to be the focus of mass media, as represented by major networks like CNN, Fox News and MSNBC. They, have maintained their audiences based on the success of providing entertaining programming, focusing on dramatic content. The entertaining and engaging political news , some mass media outlets introduced, procured the rise of Soft news.

As indicated by Newman and Smith, in their essay titled “Fanning the Flames, Religious Media Consumption and American Politics,” in 2007, soft news can have considerable political influence. Britannica.com defines “soft news” as, “Soft news also called market-centered journalism, journalistic style and genre that blurs the line between information and entertainment. …” Furthermore, as pointed out by Baum, in 2005 consumers of soft news are being exposed to relevant political suggestions as a collateral to turning their attention to soft news.

See also
 American election campaigns in the 19th century
 History of American newspapers
 Mass media
 Political journalism
 Social media and political communication in the United States
 Talk radio

References

Further reading

Surveys
 Blanchard, Margaret A., ed. History of the Mass Media in the United States, An Encyclopedia. (1998)
 Brennen, Bonnie and Hanno Hardt, eds. Picturing the Past: Media, History and Photography. (1999)
 Caswell, Lucy Shelton, ed. Guide to Sources in American Journalism History. (1989)
 Cull, Nicholas John, David Culbert and David Welch, eds. Mass Persuasion: A Historical Encyclopedia, 1500 to the Present (2003) 479pp; Worldwide coverage
 Daly, Christopher B. Covering America: A Narrative History of a Nation's Journalism (University of Massachusetts Press; 2012) 544 pages; identifies five distinct periods since the colonial era.
 Emery, Michael, Edwin Emery, and Nancy L. Roberts. The Press and America: An Interpretive History of the Mass Media 9th ed. (1999), standard textbook 
 Kotler, Johathan and Miles Beller. American Datelines: Major News Stories from Colonial Times to the Present. (2003)
 McKerns, Joseph P., ed. Biographical Dictionary of American Journalism. (1989)
 Mott, Frank Luther. American Journalism: A History of Newspapers in the United States, 1690–1960 (3rd ed. 1962). major reference source and interpretive history.
 Nord, David Paul. Communities of Journalism: A History of American Newspapers and Their Readers. (2001)
 Paneth, Donald. The encyclopedia of American journalism (1983)
 Pride, Armistead S. and Clint C. Wilson. A History of the Black Press. (1997)
 Schudson, Michael. Discovering the News: A Social History of American Newspapers. (1978).
 Sloan, W. David, James G. Stovall, and James D. Startt. The Media in America: A History, 4th ed. (1999)
 Startt, James D. and W. David Sloan. Historical Methods in Mass Communication. (1989)
 Streitmatter, Rodger. Mightier Than the Sword: How the News Media Have Shaped American History (3rd ed. 2011)  excerpt; 1997 edition online
 Vaughn, Stephen L., ed. Encyclopedia of American journalism (Routledge, 2007)

Historical eras
 Humphrey, Carol Sue. The Press of the Young Republic, 1783–1833 (1993)  online
 Kaplan, Richard Lee. Politics and the American press: the rise of objectivity, 1865-1920 (2002)
 Pasley. Jeffrey L. "The Tyranny of Printers": Newspaper Politics in the Early Republic (2001) online review
 Strauss, Dafnah. "Ideological closure in newspaper political language during the US 1872 election campaign." Journal of Historical Pragmatics 15.2 (2014): 255-291.  DOI: 10.1075/jhp.15.2.06str  online
 Summers, Mark Wahlgren. The Press Gang: Newspapers and Politics, 1865–1878 (1994) online

Recent
 Berry, Jeffrey M. and Sarah Sobieraj. The Outrage Industry: Political Opinion Media and the New Incivility (2014); focus on talk radio and partisan cable news
 Blake, David Haven. Liking Ike: Eisenhower, Advertising, and the Rise of Celebrity Politics (Oxford UP, 2016). xvi, 281 pp. 
 Bobbitt, Randy. Us Against Them: The Political Culture of Talk Radio (Lexington Books; 2010) 275 pages. Traces the history of the medium since its beginnings in the 1950s and examines its varied impact on elections through 2008.
 Fiske, John, and Black Hawk Hancock. Media Matters: Race & Gender in US Politics (Routledge, 2016).
 Gainous, Jason, and Kevin M. Wagner. Tweeting to Power: The Social Media Revolution in American Politics (Oxford Studies in Digital Politics) (2013) excerpt
 Graber, Doris A. Mass media and American politics (2009);  widely cited textbook
 Levendusky, Matthew. How Partisan Media Polarize America (2013)
 Street, Paul, and Anthony R. Dimaggio, eds. Crashing the tea party: Mass media and the campaign to remake American politics ( Routledge, 2015).
 Stromer-Galley, Jennifer. Presidential Campaigning in the Internet Age (2014) excerpt 
 West, D. M. Air Wars: Television Advertising and Social Media in Election Campaigns, 1952-2012 (2013).

Media
Works about politics